Oxonhoath may refer to

Oxon Hoath, a former manor and Royal Park at West Peckham, Kent.
Oxonhoath Mill, a watermill on the River Bourne, in the parish of West Peckham.